Femita Ayanbeku (born June 30, 1992) is an American Paralympic athlete of Haitian and Nigerian descent, she competes in sprinting events at international track and field competitions. She is a World bronze medalist and has competed at the 2016 and 2020 Summer Paralympics.

Personal life
In July 2003, eleven year old Ayanbeku and her three sisters and cousins were sitting in the back of her cousin's station wagon travelling on the highway in Stoughton, Massachusetts. Her life changed suddenly when she and her sisters and cousins got involved in a serious car accident when the car struck a guardrail, spun around and the doors opened, Ayanbeku and one of her sisters were thrown out of the car onto the other side of the highway. Femita had severe injuries and spent several days in hospital, her right leg was amputated because the damage was so severe that she lost a lot of blood circulation from the accident.

Sporting career
Following her recovery from the car accident, Ayanbeku tried out basketball in first year at high school but only did the sport for a short period of time because she had too much discomfort on her prosthetic. She was introduced to the sport by Jerome Singleton when she visited a para track and field open event in November 2015, he introduced his coach Sherman Hart to her and Hart found that Ayanbeku had a raw talent for track and field. Hart and Singleton took Ayanbeku to one of their training sessions, she describes running as feeling natural and felt that she had two feet again, Hart highly encouraged her to go to Charlotte, North Carolina for the 2016 US Paralympic Team Trials in late June 2016. Ayanbeku successfully qualified for the 2016 Summer Paralympics in the 100 metres and 200 metres.

She qualified for 2020 Summer Paralympics in the 100 metres and 200 metres again, she ran well in her heats but couldn't compete in the finals due to testing positive for COVID-19.

References

1992 births
Living people
American sportspeople of Nigerian descent
American sportspeople of Haitian descent
People from Randolph, Massachusetts
Track and field athletes from Boston
American female sprinters
Paralympic sprinters
Sprinters with limb difference
Athletes (track and field) at the 2016 Summer Paralympics
Athletes (track and field) at the 2020 Summer Paralympics
Medalists at the World Para Athletics Championships
20th-century American women
21st-century American women